Dr. Enuf is a brand of soft drink bottled by Tri-City Beverage in Johnson City, Tennessee. It is a lemon-lime flavored drink (though its taste is different from common lemon-lime sodas such as Sprite or 7 Up), and is fortified with several water-soluble vitamins. Its marketing slogan is "Enuf is Enough!"

Dr. Enuf's origins date back to 1949, when a Chicago businessman named William Mark Swartz was urged by coworkers to formulate a soft drink fortified with vitamins as an alternative to sugar sodas full of empty calories. He developed an "energy booster" drink containing B vitamins, caffeine and cane sugar. After placing a notice in a trade magazine seeking a bottler, he formed a partnership with Charles Gordon of Tri-City Beverage to produce and distribute the soda.

Early product heritage with Mountain Dew
 Early in its development, Dr. Enuf was reported to have several therapeutic effects, including the easing of stomach pains, relief from hangovers and a clearing of the mind. One interesting note is that one of the early advertised uses of Dr. Enuf, curing hangovers, coincided with Tri-City Beverage's other soft drink at the time, a drink mixer called Mountain Dew. Tri-City Beverage later sold the rights to Mountain Dew to Pepsi, but kept the Dr. Enuf brand.

The drink is still produced to this day by Tri-Cities Beverage. Dr. Enuf is available in original, Diet, Herbal and Diet Herbal varieties. A bottle of any of the varieties contains at least 80% of the recommended daily nutritional requirement of thiamine (Vitamin B1), niacin (Vitamin B3), potassium and iodine. The herbal varieties also contain ginseng and guarana, and are cherry flavored.

Availability
Dr. Enuf is widely distributed in the Bristol-Kingsport-Johnson City region of Northeast Tennessee, plus parts of southwestern Virginia and western North Carolina.

While hard to find, Dr. Enuf is available in select locations throughout the Southeast as well as at many Cracker Barrel locations throughout the country. It is also available at Pal's restaurant locations.
As of 2022, Dr. Enuf is also available in Eastern Kentucky.

References

External links 
 , sells & ships the drinks in sets of twenty-four.
 .

American soft drinks
Citrus sodas
Johnson City, Tennessee
Lemon-lime sodas